Zerkaly is a rural locality (a selo) and the administrative center of Zerkalsky Selsoviet, Shipunovsky District, Altai Krai, Russia. The population was 659 as of 2013. There are 10 streets.

Geography 
Zerkaly is located on the Zerkalnoye Lake, 45 km northwest of Shipunovo (the district's administrative centre) by road. Andreyevka is the nearest rural locality.

References 

Rural localities in Shipunovsky District